Agdal is a historical concept in Morocco, referring to gardens or farmland owned by the Makhzen or the community, and forbidden to the public, whether permanently or during certain periods. Nowadays, the name is used for areas in some Moroccan cities such as Rabat, Fes, Marrakech and Meknes, which had historically been protected gardens, going back at least to the Almohad era in the 12th century.

The word Agdal comes from Amazigh language, and means either "garden" or "protected grazing land", usually surrounded by a fence and forbidden to the public. Many places called "Agdal" today, especially within urban areas, were originally grazing lands for government-owned horses. In general, the term "Agdal" has the connotation of something private or forbidden.

Agdals in Morocco 
 Agdal is an urban community in Rabat, Morocco.
 Agdal Gardens is a garden area in Marrakech, Morocco.
 Agdal is an urban community in Fes, Morocco.
 Agdal is an urban community in Meknes, Morocco.

References 

History of Morocco
Agdal
Moroccan Arabic words and phrases